Franklin Núñez (born January 18, 1977 in Nagua, Dominican Republic) is a former Major League Baseball pitcher.

Career

In February , Núñez signed a minor league contract with the Colorado Rockies, where he spent the season before retiring.

References

External links

1977 births
Living people
Brooklyn Cyclones players
Dominican Republic expatriate baseball players in the United States
Durham Bulls players

Major League Baseball pitchers
Major League Baseball players from the Dominican Republic
Nashville Sounds players
Newark Bears players
People from Nagua
Richmond Braves players
Tampa Bay Devil Rays players
York Revolution players
Clearwater Phillies players
Colorado Springs Sky Sox players
Criollos de Caguas players
Dominican Republic expatriate baseball players in Puerto Rico
Dominican Republic expatriate baseball players in Mexico
Dominican Republic expatriate baseball players in Taiwan
Florida Complex League Phillies players
Gigantes del Cibao players
Martinsville Phillies players
Montgomery Biscuits players
Piedmont Boll Weevils players
Reading Phillies players
Saraperos de Saltillo players
Scranton/Wilkes-Barre Red Barons players
Sinon Bulls players